The 2012–13 Men's FIH Hockey World League was the inaugural season of the men's field hockey national team league series. The tournament started in August 2012 in Prague, Czech Republic and finished in January 2014 in New Delhi, India.

The Semifinals of this competition also served as a qualifier for the 2014 Men's Hockey World Cup as the 6 highest placed teams apart from the host nation and the five continental champions qualified.

The Netherlands won the tournament's Final round for the first time after defeating New Zealand 7–2 in the final match. England won the third place match by defeating Australia 2–1.

Qualification
Each national association member of the International Hockey Federation (FIH) had the opportunity to compete in the tournament, and after seeking entries to participate, 62 teams were announced to compete. However, for different reasons, the final count of participating teams was 54.

The 8 teams ranked between 1st and 8th in the FIH World Rankings current at early 2011 received an automatic bye to the Semifinals while the 8 teams ranked between 9th and 16th received an automatic bye to Round 2. Those sixteen teams, shown with qualifying rankings, were the following:

 (1)
 (2)
 (3)
 (4)
 (5)
 (6)
 (7)
 (8)
 (9)
 (10)
 (11)
 (12)
 (13)
 (14)
 (15)
 (16)

Schedule

Round 1

 – Qatar´s results were officially deleted from the event due to an eligibility problem with some of its players.

Round 2

 – Azerbaijan withdrew from participating and Oman took their place.
 – Malaysia was chosen to host a Semifinal therefore exempt from Round 2, to which were qualified by ranking basis. The Czech Republic took their place.
 – As Malaysia was chosen to host a Semifinal, one less berth was available at that event. France (17th) qualified as the highest-ranked second-placed team between the Saint-Germain-en-Laye and Elektrostal Round 2 events, leaving Russia (20th) unable to qualify.

Semifinals

Final

Final ranking
FIH issued a final ranking to determine the world ranking. The final ranking was as follows:

References

 
Men's FIH Hockey World League